Daniel Collyer (b Little Shelford  August 25, 1848; d Dedham, Essex 25 July 1924) was Archdeacon of Malta from 1903 until 1905.

Collyer was educated at Rugby School and Clare College, Cambridge; and ordained in 1871.  After a curacy in Falkenham he was Vicar of Castle Acre then West Newton. He was Chaplain at Hyeres from 1890 to 1893; and then at Cannes until his appointment as Archdeacon. After his return from the Mediterranean he was the Incumbent at Wymondham then Bobbington.

Notes

People from Little Shelford
People educated at Rugby School
Alumni of Clare College, Cambridge
Archdeacons of Malta
19th-century Maltese Anglican priests
1848 births
1924 deaths